Multivac is the name of a fictional supercomputer appearing in over a dozen science fiction stories by American writer Isaac Asimov. Asimov's depiction of Multivac, a mainframe computer accessible by terminal, originally by specialists using machine code and later by any user, and used for directing the global economy and humanity's development, has been seen as the defining conceptualization of the genre of computers for the period (1950s–1960s). Multivac has been described as the direct ancestor of HAL 9000.

Description 
Like most of the technologies Asimov describes in his fiction, Multivac's exact specifications vary among appearances. In all cases, it is a government-run computer that answers questions posed using natural language, and it is usually buried deep underground for security purposes. According to his autobiography In Memory Yet Green, Asimov coined the name in imitation of UNIVAC, an early mainframe computer. Asimov had assumed the name "Univac" denoted a computer with a single vacuum tube (it actually is an acronym for "Universal Automatic Computer"), and on the basis that a computer with many such tubes would be more powerful, called his fictional  computer "Multivac".  His later short story "The Last Question", however, expands the AC suffix to be "analog computer". However, Asimov never settles on a particular size for the computer (except for mentioning it is very large):86 or the supporting facilities around it. In the short story "Franchise" it is described as half a mile long (~800 meters) and three stories high, at least as far as the general public knows, while "All the Troubles of the World" states it fills all of Washington D.C.. There are frequent mentions of corridors and people inside Multivac. Unlike the artificial intelligences portrayed in his Robot series, Multivac's early interface is mechanized and impersonal, consisting of complex command consoles few humans can operate. In "The Last Question", Multivac is shown as having a life of many thousands of years, growing ever more enormous with each section of the story, which can explain its different reported sizes as occurring further down the internal timeline of the overarching story.:20

Storylines
Multivac appeared in over a dozen science fiction stories by American writer Isaac Asimov, some of which have entered the popular imagination. In the early Multivac story, "Franchise", Multivac chooses a single "most representative" person from the population of the United States, whom the computer then interrogates to determine the country's overall orientation. All elected offices are then filled by the candidates the computer calculates as acceptable to the populace. Asimov wrote this story as the logical culmination – and/or possibly the reductio ad absurdum – of UNIVAC's ability to forecast election results from small samples.

In possibly the most famous Multivac story, "The Last Question", two slightly drunken technicians ask Multivac if humanity can reverse the increase of entropy. Multivac fails, displaying the error message "INSUFFICIENT DATA FOR MEANINGFUL ANSWER". The story continues through many iterations of computer technology, each more powerful and ethereal than the last. Each of these computers is asked the question, and each returns the same response until finally the universe dies. At that point Multivac's final successor, the Cosmic AC (which exists entirely in hyperspace) has collected all the data it can, and so poses the question to itself. As the universe died, Cosmic AC drew all of humanity into hyperspace in order to preserve them until it could finally answer the Last Question. Ultimately, Cosmic AC did decipher the answer, announcing "Let there be light!" and essentially ascending to the state of the God of the Old Testament.  Asimov claimed this to be the favorite of his stories.

In "All the Troubles of the World", the version of Multivac depicted reveals a very unexpected problem. Having had the weight of the whole of humanity's problems on its figurative shoulders for ages it has grown tired, and it sets plans in motion to cause its own death.

Significance 
Asimov's depiction of Multivac has been seen as the defining conceptualization of the genre of computers for the period, just as his development of robots defined a subsequent generation of thinking machines, and Multivac has been described as the direct ancestor of HAL 9000. Though the technology initially depended on bulky vacuum tubes, the concept – that all information could be contained on computer(s) and accessed from a domestic terminal – constitutes an early reference to the possibility of the Internet (as in "Anniversary"). Multivac has been considered within the context of public access information systems and used in teaching computer science, as well as with regard to the nature of an electoral democracy, as its influence over global democracy and the directed economy increased ("Franchise"). Asimov stories featuring Multivac have also been taught in literature classes. In AI control terms, Multivac has been described as both an 'oracle' and a 'nanny'.

Bibliography
Asimov's stories featuring Multivac:
 "Question" (1955; withdrawn)
 "Franchise" (1955)
 "The Dead Past" (1956)
 "Someday" (1956)
 "The Last Question" (1956)
 "Jokester" (1956)
 "All the Troubles of the World" (1958)
 "Anniversary" (1959)
 "The Machine that Won the War" (1961)
 "My Son, the Physicist" (1962)
 "Key Item" (1968)
 "The Life and Times of Multivac" (1975)
 "Point of View" (1975)
 "True Love" (1977)
 "It Is Coming" (1979)
 "Potential" (1983)

See also
AI control problem
Government by algorithm
Isaac Asimov short stories bibliography 
List of fictional computers

References 

Fictional computers
Isaac Asimov
 
Fictional elements introduced in 1955